George Ernest Kenworthy (1887 – 10 November 1917) was an English professional footballer who played in the Football League for Bradford City as an inside right.

Career
Kenworthy signed for Bradford City in April 1907 from Manningham Recreational. During his time with the club he made two appearances in the Football League, scoring once. He left Valley Parade in 1908 and signed for Midland League club Huddersfield Town in 1909, for whom he made 20 appearances and scored six goals.

Personal life
Kenworthy trained to be a teacher at Peterborough Training College and eventually became headmaster of Matlock Town Schools by 1914. After enlisting in Matlock, he served as a gunner in the Royal Garrison Artillery during the First World War and was killed by a shell on the Western Front in November 1917. Kenworthy was buried in Coxyde Military Cemetery, Belgium and left a widow and a child.

Career statistics

Sources

References

1887 births
English footballers
Bradford City A.F.C. players
Huddersfield Town A.F.C. players
English Football League players
Association football inside forwards
1917 deaths
British Army personnel of World War I
British military personnel killed in World War I
Royal Garrison Artillery soldiers
People from Matlock, Derbyshire
Footballers from Derbyshire
Midland Football League players
Schoolteachers from Derbyshire
Heads of schools in England
Military personnel from Derbyshire